Kaucminde Manor is a manor house, also referred as palace due to its design, in the historical region of Zemgale, in Latvia.

History 
The manor house was built around 1780 for Count Peter Ludwig von der Pahlen by Danish-born architect Severin Jensen. A project to attach the manor house to the adjacent buildings was completed in 1912, so the semi-circular complex is also called Kaucminde Palace.

See also
List of palaces and manor houses in Latvia

References

External links

  Kaucminde Manor

Manor houses in Latvia
Bauske County